St. John The Baptist Roman Catholic Church is a historic church at Ohio 694 and Main Street in Glandorf, Ohio. It was built in 1875 and added to the National Register in 1977.

History
In 1834, Father Johann Wilhelm Horstmann and other settlers immigrated from Glandorf, Germany, to Putnam County, Ohio. They acquired a tract of land from the government, and established the town of Glandorf along with the first Catholic church in Putnam County.

The congregation quickly outgrew the original building and, in 1837, a larger hewn-log church was dedicated to St John the Baptist. Father Horstmann died in 1843 and Father Bohne, who took over the parish, began construction of a brick church building. Shortly afterward, the parish put under the control of the Sanguinist Fathers and, in 1848, a convent was established.

The current church building was built in 1875 and dedicated in 1878. It was designed by Cudell & Richardson, and it was the largest Roman Catholic church in Ohio at the time. The church is built in the Neo-Gothic style and has a 225-foot spire. It contained "figurines from Austria, stained glass windows imported from Munich, Germany, and a highly detailed pulpit which was purchased for $1,400 at the Centennial Exposition in Philadelphia", according to Michael Leach, who wrote a book on the church's history. Pioneer cemetery, which holds the grave of Father Horstmann, sits beside the church.

In 1977, the church was added to the National Register.

In 1992, a fire in the church caused $1.2 million worth of damage to the inside.

In 2015, the parish opened a museum to display the history of the church and the town of Glandorf.

Church restoration

In 2017, the church underwent a 3-month restoration and improvement project. The $1.2 million project involved preventive measures such as fiberglassing the interior walls, painting, and installing updated storm windows to protect the stained glass. In addition, a lowered ceiling in the vestibule was removed to uncover a stained glass window. The work was carried out by Conrad Schmitt Studios of New Berlin, Wisconsin.

References

External links

Description of the restoration project, with pictures

Churches in the Roman Catholic Diocese of Toledo
Churches on the National Register of Historic Places in Ohio
Gothic Revival church buildings in Ohio
Roman Catholic churches completed in 1875
Buildings and structures in Putnam County, Ohio
National Register of Historic Places in Putnam County, Ohio
19th-century Roman Catholic church buildings in the United States